Skrewdriver were an English punk rock band formed by Ian Stuart Donaldson in Poulton-le-Fylde, Lancashire, in 1976. Originally a punk band, Skrewdriver changed into a white supremacist rock band after reuniting in the 1980s. Their original line-up split in January 1979 and Donaldson reformed the band with different musicians in 1982.

Career
Ian Stuart Donaldson, formerly of the cover band Tumbling Dice, formed Skrewdriver as a punk rock band in Poulton-le-Fylde in 1976. At first, Skrewdriver sported a punk appearance, but they later changed their image to a skinhead look. In 1978, Donaldson moved to Manchester, where he recruited guitarist Glenn Jones and drummer Martin Smith. With Kevin MacKay on bass, this lineup toured extensively and built a strong following, but certain venues were reluctant to book the band because of their reputation as a violent skinhead band. Performing largely for a skinhead audience, the first versions of the band released one album and two singles on Chiswick Records. Skrewdriver briefly adopted a rocker/biker-influenced look around the time they released the EP Built Up Knocked Down (1979).

Donaldson resurrected the band name Skrewdriver in 1982 with a new band line-up. Although the original band had a minor reputation for attracting violence at their concerts—Boomtown Rats frontman Bob Geldof was reportedly knocked unconscious by a friend of Donaldson who believed that Skrewdriver's sound had been sabotaged—they did not openly support any political ideology or organisation.

The re-formed Skrewdriver eventually became openly supportive of white nationalist groups, after a lengthy period of publicly denying such support. The band released the single "White Power" in 1983 and their second album, Hail the New Dawn, in 1984. Although both Skrewdriver and the band Sham 69 had skinhead followings and racist fans early in their careers, Sham 69 denounced racism and performed at Rock Against Racism concerts. Donaldson eventually aligned himself with neo-Nazism, saying: "I would describe myself as a British National Socialist, not a German one, and so don't think I'm at odds with British patriots." The band became associated with the National Front and British National Party, raising funds for them (and affiliated organisations) through the White Noise record label. They released records on Rock-O-Rama, a label that became known for National Socialist sympathies. Skrewdriver was instrumental in setting up Blood & Honour, a neo-Nazi music promotion network.

Their song Smash the IRA became popular amongst Loyalists in Northern Ireland.  It was one of a number of Skrewdriver songs covered by a Belfast band called Offensive Weapon, who also covered songs by Black artists such as Chuck Berry.

Some members of the original Skrewdriver line-up objected strongly to the new direction in which Donaldson took the band. Roger Armstrong of Chiswick Records said:

However, John "Grinny" Grinton later stated in an interview that he had no problem with the new Skrewdriver, and that he became a member of the National Front along with Donaldson.

Donaldson died on 24 September 1993 following a car crash. His death catalyzed the demise of Skrewdriver, and had a strong impact in the white power rock scene. John "Grinny" Grinton died from cancer in June 2005.

Merv Shields died on 1 January 2022 due to COVID-19 complications.

Members

Original line-up
 Ian Stuart Donaldson – vocals, rhythm guitar
 Phil Walmsley – lead guitar
 Ron Hartley – lead guitar
 Kev McKay – bass
 John "Grinny" Grinton – drums
 Dirk Deem

Other members
Mark Radcliffe
Merv Shields
Glenn Jones
Martin Smith
Paul Swain
Murray (Ohms) Holme
Adam Douglas / Paul Mushy Marshall (Drums)

Discography

Studio albums

All Skrewed Up (1977) (Chiswick) (later re-issued as The Early Years with extra tracks)
Hail the New Dawn (1984) (Rock-O-Rama)
Blood & Honour (1985) (Rock-O-Rama)
White Rider (1987) (Rock-O-Rama)
After the Fire (1988) (Rock-O-Rama)
Warlord (1989) (Rock-O-Rama)
The Strong Survive (1990) (Rock-O-Rama)
Freedom What Freedom (1992) (Rock-O-Rama)
Hail Victory (1994) (Asgard Records – A division of Rock-O-Rama)
Undercover (2007) (collection of cover songs)

12" EPs
Back with a Bang / I Don't Like You (1982) (SKREW1 label)
Boots & Braces (1987) (previously released tracks) (Rock-O-Rama)
Voice of Britain (1987) (previously released tracks) (Rock-O-Rama)

Singles
"You're So Dumb" / "Better Off Crazy" (1977) (Chiswick)
"Antisocial" / "Breakdown" (1977) (Chiswick)
"Street Fight" / "Unbeliever" (1977) (Chiswick – recorded but not released)
"Built Up, Knocked Down" / "Case of Pride" / "Breakout" (1979) (TJM label)
"White Power" / "Smash the IRA" / "Shove the Dove" (1983) (White Noise)
"Voice of Britain" / "Sick Society" (1984) (White Noise)
"Invasion" / "On the Streets" (1984) (Rock-O-Rama)
"After the Fire" / "Sweet Home Alabama (cover version of Lynyrd Skynyrd)" (1988) (Street Rock'n'Roll)
"Land of Ice" / "Retaliate" (1988) (Street Rock'n'Roll)
"Their Kingdom Will Fall" / "Simple Man" (1989) (Street Rock'n'Roll)
"The Evil Crept In" / "Glory" (1989) (Street Rock'n'Roll)
"The Showdown" / "Deep Inside" (1990) (White Pride Records)
"You're So Dumb" / "The Only One" (1990) (Street Rock'n'Roll)
"Streetfight" / "Where's It Gonna End" (1990) (Street Rock'n'Roll)
"Stand Proud" / "Backstabber" (1991) (Street Rock'n'Roll)
"Warzone" / "Shining Down" (1991) (Street Rock'n'Roll)

Live albums 
Live Marquee (1977)
We've Got the Power (1987) (Viking) (live) (reissued on CD with bonus live & demo tracks)
Live and Kicking (1991) (Rock-O-Rama) (double album)
Live at Waterloo (1995) (ISD/White Terror) (recorded 12 September 1992)
This One's for the Skinheads (live, recorded 23 April 1987)
The Last Gig in Germany (1996)

Radio
Peel Session (1977) BBC Radio 1

Songs on compilations
"Government Action" on Catch a Wave (1978) – 10-inch 2×LP by NICE
"You're So Dumb" on Long Shots, Dead Certs and Odds On Favorites (Chiswick Chartbusters Vol.2) (1978) – LP by Chiswick
"When the Boat Comes In" on This Is White Noise (1983) – 7-inch EP featuring three other bands
"Boots & Braces" and "Antisocial" on United Skins (1982) – LP by The Last Resort shop
"Don't Let Them" and "Tearing Down the Wall" on No Surrender (1985) – LP by Rock-O-Rama
"Land of Ice", "Free Men" and "The New Boss" on Gods of War 1 (1987) – LP by Street Rock & Roll
"Rising" and "We Can't Be Beaten" on Gods of War 2 (1989) – LP by Street Rock & Roll
"Antisocial" on The Ugly Truth About Blackpool (2005) – CD by Just Say No to Government Music
"Night Trains" on Ballads of Blood and Honor (?) – CD by Unknown Grito sudaka

See also
List of neo-Nazi bands

References

Further reading
White Noise: Inside the International Nazi Skinhead Scene. Edited by Nick Lowles and Steve Silver, London 1998. .
Skrewdriver: The First Ten Years – The Way It's Got to Be! by Joe Pearce. Skrewdriver Services, London 1987.
Ian Stuart – His Message Across to You. Everlasting Songs. Excalibur Services, Antwerp 1995.
Diamond in the Dust – The Ian Stuart Biography. Blood and Honour England, London 2002.
Nazi Rock Star – Ian Stuart-Skrewdriver Biography by Paul London (a.k.a. Paul Burnley of No Remorse). Midgård, Gothenburg 2002.
Ian Stuart Donaldson – Memories by Mark Green. PC Records, Chemnitz 2007.
Ian Stuart Donaldson – Rock'n Roll Patriot (Memories II) by Mark Green. Mark Green, 2012.

External links

Skrewdriver.com

1976 establishments in England
1993 disestablishments in England
Oi! groups
English punk rock groups
Musical groups reestablished in 1982
Musical groups established in 1976
Neo-Nazi musical groups
Neo-Nazism in the United Kingdom
Musical groups disestablished in 1979
Musical groups disestablished in 1993
Anti-communist organizations